was a Japanese folklorist, and a close collaborator and friend of the historian Amino Yoshihiko.

Biography
He graduated from the department of literature at Tokyo University of Education (now University of Tsukuba) in 1960. He was appointed as an Assistant Lecturer at the Tokyo Gakugei University in 1970, and became full-time professor at the University of Tsukuba in 1980. On his official retirement he took up a professorship at Kanagawa University.

Works
He wrote many books and articles on popular religion and the Emperor system.

References

1936 births
University of Tsukuba alumni
Academic staff of Tokyo Gakugei University
Academic staff of Kanagawa University
Academic staff of the University of Tsukuba
2000 deaths
Japanese folklore
People from Yokohama